Cryptoblabes plagioleuca, the mango-flower moth,  blossom moth or mango-flower webber, is a species of snout moth in the genus Cryptoblabes. It was described by Turner in 1904. It is found from Indonesia (Sumatra), New Hebrides, Australia and the Society Islands.

Adults are red-brown and grey with a double line on the forewing.

The larvae feed on mango and citrus species. They feed in groups on dying flower parts under light webbing. The larvae are spotted, pale brown or beige with dark shiny heads.

References

Moths described in 1904
Cryptoblabini